The Norwegian Railway Club is an association which is involved in the preservation of Norwegian museum railways. NMT  has its operating base  at Hønefoss Station  in Ringerike, Norway. The society was founded on 22 May 1969, and is based at Bryn Station in Oslo, but with local groups all over the country. It publishes the magazine På Sporet four times a year, as well as publishing numerous books. The club also operates two heritage railways, the Old Voss Line in Bergen, and the Krøder Line. Most of the work is done by volunteers.

The Norwegian Railway Club runs Norwegian Heritage Trains or NMT (Norsk Museumstog). All the members of NMT are volunteers and their classic train activities are under government supervision. NMT is doing restoration, preservation and operation of classic trains at the  part of the Norwegian railway network. The activity of NMT is not run for the purpose of profit. All income of the activity is solely used for the preservation of Norwegian railway history so that the coming generations will be allowed to experience and learn transport by train of the 19th and 20th centuries. .

References

External links
Norsk Museumstog website
Norsk Jernbaneklubb website
 Official site

Heritage railways in Norway
Organisations based in Oslo
Non-profit organisations based in Norway
Hobbyist organizations
1969 establishments in Norway
Organizations established in 1969